The men's 200 metre breaststroke event at the 1964 Summer Olympics took place between October 13 and October 15. This swimming event used the breaststroke. Because an Olympic-size swimming pool is 50 metres long, this race consisted of four lengths of the pool.

Medalists

Results

Heats
Heat 1

Heat 2

Heat 3

Heat 4

Heat 5

Semifinals

Semifinal 1

Semifinal 2

Final

Key: WR = World record

References

Men's breaststroke 200 metre
Men's events at the 1964 Summer Olympics